The This Time Around Tour was a tour by American band Hanson. The tour supported the band's second studio album, This Time Around (2000). The tour predominantly visited North America with additional dates in Chile, Argentina, and Brazil. The concert film At the Fillmore was released following the tour.

Opening act
Neve
M2M
Michelle Branch
John Popper

Setlist
The following setlist was obtained from the September 11, 2000 concert, held at the Hammerstein Ballroom in New York City. It includes music primarily from albums ‘’Middle of Nowhere’’ and ‘’This Time Around’’, in addition to various covers. This does not represent all concerts for the duration of the tour.

"Look At You"
"Crosstown Traffic"
"Where's the Love"
"Runaway Run"
"Wish That I Was There"
"Save Me"
"Can’t Stop"
"Thinking of You"
”Piece of My Heart”
”Lucy” 
”A Song to Sing" 
”Sure About It” 
”Love Song” 
”You Can't Always Get What You Want”
”A Minute Without You”
”Dying to Be Alive”
”River”
”Man from Milwaukee”
”This Time Around”
”If Only”
”Speechless”
”Hand in Hand”
”You Never Know”
”Johnny B. Goode”
”MMMBop”
”In the City”
”This Time Around” 

Encore
"I Want You to Want Me”

Tour dates

Concert film
At the Fillmore was taped at the Fillmore music venue in San Francisco, California on June 27, 2000 before a live audience. The concert featured a set and setlist resembling the tour. It aired on DirecTv throughout the summer of 2000 and was released on DVD in April 2001.

External links
 Tour dates and other information

References

2000 concert tours
Hanson (band)